Acer Liquid MT (or Liquid Metal) is a smartphone from Acer that runs the Android operating system. After some rumors the smartphone was officially unveiled in October 2010. The smartphone runs Android 2.2 (Froyo) operating system and it is powered by an 800 MHz Qualcomm MSM7230 processor. It has 512 MB of RAM and 512 MB ROM. The device is capable of 4-finger-multitouch input and has integrated GPS too. It has a 5 MP camera.

Specifications

Hardware
The specifications according to the Acer website in October 2010: 
Size and weight: 115 x 63 x 13.5  135 g
Screen: LCD 3.6” WVGA multi-touch capacitive screen, 16 M colors
Connectivity: HSPA 14.4Mbit/s, WiFi and Bluetooth
Social applications: Built-in Facebook and Twidroid applications

The Liquid Metal is available in two colors: silver and brown

Software
Acer Liquid Metal ships with Android 2.2 Froyo. In October 2011 the 2.3.5 Gingerbread update for the Liquid MT was officially released by Acer.

See also
Acer Liquid A1
Acer Liquid E
Galaxy Nexus
List of Android devices

References

External links
Acer Smartphone Official Website
Acer Liquid Official Website
Acer Liquid Metal Official Website
Reasons Why Some Smartphones Have Multiple Cameras?

Liquid Metal
Android (operating system) devices
Touchscreen portable media players
Mobile phones introduced in 2010